Nessia is a genus of skinks, lizards in the family Scincidae. The genus is endemic to Sri Lanka. Species in the genus Nessia are commonly known as snake skinks.

Species
The following nine species are recognized as being valid:
Nessia bipes  – two-legged nessia
Nessia burtonii  – Burton's nessia
Nessia deraniyagalai  – Deraniyagala's nessia
Nessia didactyla  – two-toed nessia
Nessia gansi 
Nessia hickanala  – Hickanala nessia
Nessia layardi  – Layard's nessia
Nessia monodactyla  – one-toed nessia
Nessia sarasinorum  – Müller's nessia

Nota bene: A binomial authority in parentheses indicates that the species was originally described in a genus other than Nessia.

References

Further reading
Gray JE (1839). "Catalogue of the Slender-tongued Saurians, with Descriptions of many new Genera and Species". Annals and Magazine of Natural History, First Series 2: 331–337. (Nessia, new genus, p. 336).
Smith MA (1935). The Fauna of British India, Including Ceylon and Burma. Reptilia and Amphibia. Vol. II.—Sauria. London: Secretary of State for India in Council. (Taylor and Francis, printers). xiii + 440 pp. + Plate I + 2 maps. (Genus Nessia, pp. 356–357; Nessia bipes, nomen novum, p. 359).
Taylor EH (1950). "Ceylonese Lizards of the Family Scincidae". University of Kansas Science Bulletin 33 (2): 481–518. (Genus Nessia, pp. 508–509; Nessia deraniyagalai, new species, pp. 516–518, Figures 8A, 8B).
Batuwita S, Edirisinghe U (2017). "Nessia gansi: a Second Three-toed Snake-Skink (Reptilia: Squamata: Scincidae) from Sri Lanka with the Designation of a Neotype for Nessia burtonii Gray". Travaux du Muséum National d’Histoire Naturelle «Grigore Antipa» 60 (1): 377–388.

 
Reptiles of South Asia
Endemic fauna of Sri Lanka
Lizard genera
Taxa named by John Edward Gray
Reptiles of Sri Lanka